Hugh Hutchison (born 17 November 1964) is a British freestyle skier. He competed at the 1992 Winter Olympics and the 1994 Winter Olympics.

References

External links
 

1964 births
Living people
British male freestyle skiers
Olympic freestyle skiers of Great Britain
Freestyle skiers at the 1992 Winter Olympics
Freestyle skiers at the 1994 Winter Olympics
Sportspeople from Dunfermline